Abryna basalis is a species of beetle in the family Cerambycidae. It was described by Per Olof Christopher Aurivillius in 1908. It is known from the Solomon Islands.

References

Pteropliini
Beetles described in 1908